Nana Koduah Kwarteng is a Ghanaian politician, he served for the Tano South constituency as member of the first parliament of the fourth republic of Ghana in the Brong Ahafo Region of Ghana.

Politics 
Nana Koduah Kwarteng was elected during the 1992 Ghanaian parliamentary election on the ticket of the National Democratic Congress as member of the first parliament of the fourth republic of Ghana. In 1996 Ghanaian general election, he lost the seat to Grace Boachie of the National Democratic Congress. She polled 13,390 votes out of the 24,879 valid votes cast representing 39.50% over her opponents Rex Ofori-Agyeman of the New Patriotic Party (NPP) who polled 9,568 votes representing 28.20%, Godfred Kwaku Oppong of the Convention People's Party (CPP) who polled 1,267 votes representing 3.705, Osman Asante-Bonsu of the People's National Convention (PNC) who polled 330 votes representing 1.00% and Daniel Kofi Nti of the National Convention Party(NCP) who polled 324 votes representing 1.00%.

Career 
Nana Koduah Kwarteng is a former member of parliament representing Tano South constituency from 7 January 1993 to 7 January 1997.

Personal life 
He is a Christian.

References 

Ghanaian MPs 1993–1997
Ghanaian Christians
National Democratic Congress (Ghana) politicians
People from Brong-Ahafo Region
Living people
Year of birth missing (living people)